The 2020 New Mexico Senate elections took place as part of the biennial United States elections. New Mexico voters elected state senators in all 42 of the state senate's districts. State senators serve four-year terms in the New Mexico Senate.

A primary election on June 2, 2020 determined which candidates will appear on the November 3 general election ballot.

Summary of results

Closest races 
Seats where the margin of victory was under 10%:
 
  gain
 
  gain
  gain 
  
 
  gain

Retiring incumbents
Two incumbent senators (one Republican and one Democrat) chose to not seek reelection.
John Sapien (D), District 9
William Payne (R), District 20

Defeated incumbents

In primary
Seven incumbent senators (five Democrats and two Republicans) sought reelection but were defeated in the June 2 primary. The Democrats defeated in the primary were part of a conservative faction that were targeted by progressive groups for voting with Republicans to defeat certain bills including legalizing marijuana or to pass bills limiting abortion rights.
Two of the challengers who unseated the incumbents went on to lose the general election: Pamela Cordova in the 30th and Neomi Martinez-Parra in the 35th.
Richard Martinez (D), District 5
James White (R), District 19
Gabriel Ramos (D), District 28
Clemente Sanchez (D), District 30
John Arthur Smith (D), District 35
Mary Kay Papen (D), District 38
Gregg Fulfer (R), District 41

In general election
Two incumbent senators, both Republicans, won their respective primaries but were defeated in the November 3 general election by their Democratic opponent.
Candace Gould (R), District 10
Sander Rue (R), District 23

Predictions

Detailed results

Source for primary election results:

District 1

District 2

District 3
Incumbent senator Shannon Pinto was appointed to the seat in May 2019 after the death of Democrat John Pinto (her grandfather).
Democratic primary

General election

District 4
Democratic primary

General election

District 5
Democratic primary

General election

District 6
Incumbent Democrat Roberto Gonzales was appointed to the seat in December 2019 after the death of Democrat Carlos Cisneros.

District 7

District 8
Democratic primary

General election

District 9
Democratic primary

Republican primary

General election

District 10
Democratic primary

General election

District 11

District 12

District 13

District 14

District 15

District 16
Incumbent senator and former congressional candidate Antoinette Sedillo Lopez was appointed to the Senate in January 2019 after Democrat Cisco McSorley was named head of the Probation and Parole Division of the New Mexico Corrections Department.

District 17
Democratic primary

General election

District 18

District 19
Republican primary

General election

District 20
Republican primary

Democratic primary

General election

District 21

District 22

District 23

District 24

District 25

District 26

District 27

District 28
Incumbent Democrat Gabriel Ramos was appointed to his seat in January 2019 after Democrat Howie Morales resigned to become Lieutenant Governor of New Mexico.
Democratic primary

General election

District 29

District 30
Democratic primary

Republican primary

General election

District 31
Democratic primary

General election

District 32

District 33
Republican primary

General election

District 34

District 35
Democratic primary

General election

District 36
Republican primary

General election

District 37

District 38
Democratic primary

General election

District 39
Republican primary

General election

District 40

District 41
Republican primary

General election

District 42

See also
 2020 New Mexico elections
 2020 United States elections
 2020 United States Senate election in New Mexico
 2020 United States House of Representatives elections in New Mexico
 2020 New Mexico House of Representatives election

References

External links
 
 
  (State affiliate of the U.S. League of Women Voters)
 

State Senate
New Mexico State Senate elections
New Mexico Senate